The Wollemi National Park is a protected national park and wilderness area that is located in the northern Blue Mountains and Lower Hunter regions of New South Wales, in eastern Australia.

The Wollemi National Park is one of the eight protected areas that, in 2000, was inscribed to form part of the UNESCO World Heritagelisted Greater Blue Mountains Area. The Wollemi National Park is the most northwesterly of the eight protected areas within the World Heritage Site. The national park forms part of the Great Dividing Range.

The only known living wild specimens of the Wollemi Pine (Wollemia nobilis) were discovered in 1994. Special efforts were made to protect the trees when the 2019-20 Australian bushfires burned through the park.

Geology

The Wollemi National Park is located on the western edge of the Sydney Basin. It sits on four strata of sedimentary rock; the Narrabeen and Hawkesbury sandstone and shale, the Illawarra and Singleton Permian coal measures and the Wianamatta shales. The strata at this area of the Sydney Basin have an upwards tilt to the north-west. Throughout most of the park the Hawkesbury and Wianamatta series have been eroded away exposing the Narrabeen group. The landscape of the park is dominated by deep valleys, canyons, cliffs and waterfalls, formed by the weathering of the sandstone and claystone the Narrabeen group consists of. The parts of the park that lie on the Narrabeen and Hawkesbury sandstones generally have shallow soil with low nutrient levels while areas that lie on the Wianamatta shale usually have deeper and more nutrient rich soils allowing for a greater diversity of plant life. The coal measures are visible beneath cliff lines along river valleys. This layer is generally rich in nutrients and weathers to form deep clay loams. Tertiary basalt is common in the north west of the park. Basaltic peaks include Mount Coriaday, Mount Monundilla and Mount Coricudgy, the highest peak in the northern Blue Mountains. In some locations the basalt in the core of extinct volcanoes has eroded faster than the surrounding sandstone.

The Wollemi National Park is key in maintaining the quality of many tributary rivers to the Hawkesbury River and Goulburn-Hunter River catchments. The national park incorporates rivers such as the Wolgan River, Colo River and Capertee River which arise from outside the park. The Colo River is regarded as the last unpolluted river in New South Wales because the majority of it flows through the Wollemi National Park.

Biology and ecology
Eucalypt dominated open forests comprise 90% of Wollemi National Park, with over 70 species of Eucalypt recorded. The remaining 10% of the National Park comprises rainforest, heath and grassland.

The variety of habitats within Wollemi National Park allow for large diversity in animals. 58 reptile species, 38 frog species, 235 bird species and 46 mammal species have been recorded in the park.

The only known living wild specimens of the Wollemi Pine (Wollemia nobilis), a species thought to have become extinct on the mainland approximately thirty million years ago, were discovered in three small stands within deep canyons in 1994. The location is kept secret to protect the groves from diseases and trampling.

Besides the Wollemi Mint Bush, the park contains populations of the rare Banksia conferta subsp. penicillata, only described in 1981. The Wollemi Stringybark is a newly discovered species of Eucalyptus tree.

Aboriginal sites
There are many aboriginal sites within the park including cave paintings, axe grinding grooves and rock carvings. In 2003 the discovery of Eagle's Reach cave was publicly announced. This site was found by bushwalkers in 1995 but remained unknown to the wider community until a team from the Australian Museum reached the cave in May 2003. The art within this small cave is estimated to be up to 4,000 years old and it consists of up to a dozen layers of imagery depicting a wide variety of motifs rendered in ochre and charcoal. The team who recorded this site counted over 200 separate images, mainly of animals and birds but also stencils of hands, axes and a boomerang.

It is a very significant site and the remote location is being kept secret for its own protection.

Activities

 Bushwalking
 Canyoning
 Canoeing
 Camping
 Abseiling
Ganguddy Campground is a campsite located on the Cudgegong River in the park.  The local Wiradjuri Aboriginal people know the area as Ganguddy, the alternative name is Dunns Swamp.  National Parks and Wildlife Service, New South Wales manages the location.

Historical places
 Wolgan Valley
 Newnes
 Newnes glow worm tunnel
 Zig Zag Railway
 Oil shale Mining
 Glen Davis

Climate
The Wollemi area features a subtropical highland climate (Köppen climate classification Cfb) with mild to warm summers, cool to cold winters and generally steady precipitation year-round, though with a peak in the first few months of the year.

See also

 Protected areas of New South Wales

References

External links

National parks of the Hunter Region
Forests of New South Wales
Protected areas established in 1979
Rock art in Australia
1979 establishments in Australia
Singleton Council
Great Dividing Range
Blue Mountains (New South Wales)
Central Tablelands
Sclerophyll forests